The Roman Catholic Diocese of Lettere-Gragnano was a Latin Catholic diocese located in the commune of Lettere in the Metropolitan City of Naples in the southern-central Italian region Campania. In 1818, it was merged into the Diocese of Castellammare di Stabia.

History 
 Established in 987?4 as Diocese of Lettere, Latin Name: Litteræ (adjective Litterensis), on territory split off from Diocese of Amalfi, near the site of Ancient Liternum.
 Renamed in 1169 as Diocese of Lettere–Gragnano, adding to its title coastal hill town Gragnano, now also a comune (municipality) in the Metropolitan City of Naples
 Suppressed on 27 June 1818, its territory being merged into the Diocese of Castellammare di Stabia
1968: Restored as Titular Episcopal See of Lettere

Diocese of Lettere
Erected: 984
Latin Name: Litterensis

Diocese of Lettere-Gragnano
Name Changed: 1169

1818 Suppressed to the Diocese of Castellammare di Stabia

Titular see 
In 1968 the diocese was nominally restored, under its original name, as Titular bishopric of Lettere (Curiate Italian) / Litteræ (Latin) / Litteren(sis) (Latin adjective) 

It has had the following incumbents, of the fitting Episcopal (lowest) rank with an archiepiscopal exception :
 Titular Bishop: Giovanni Battista Cesana, Comboni Missionaries (M.C.C.J.) (1968.12.19 – death 1991.06.12) as emeritate; formerly Titular Bishop of Cerbali (1950.12.01 – 1953.03.25) as last Apostolic Vicar of Gulu (formerly Equatorial Nile, Uganda) (1950.12.01 – 1953.03.25), promoted first Bishop of Gulu (1953.03.25 – 1968.12.19) Titular Archbishop Luigi Travaglino (Italian) (1992.04.04 – ...) as papal diplomat : Apostolic Pro-Nuncio to Gambia (1992.04.04 – 1995.05.02), Apostolic Pro-Nuncio to Guinea (1992.04.04 – 1995.05.02), Apostolic Pro-Nuncio to Liberia (1992.04.04 – 1995.05.02), Apostolic Nuncio (ambassador) to Nicaragua (1995.05.02 – 2001), Permanent Observer to Food and Agricultural Organization of the United Nations (FAO) (2011.01.05 – 2015.02.12), Apostolic Nuncio to Monaco (2012.09.08 – 2016.01.16).

See also 
 List of Catholic dioceses in Italy
 Catholic Church in Italy

References

Sources and external links 
 GCatholic - data for all sections

Former Roman Catholic dioceses in Italy
Suppressed Roman Catholic dioceses